S. B. Adityan (27 September 1904 – May 1981), known as Si. Pa. Aditanar, was an Indian politician from Tamil Nadu belonging to the Dravida Munnetra Kazhagam party. A native of Kayamozhi,d in Tirunelveli district. He studied in England and was a lawyer by profession. He married Govindammal in 1933, who was the daughter of a very wealthy businessmen in Singapore, and with that wealth he managed to establish the Daily Thanthi paper, Sun Paper Mills after returning to India. He began his life as a newspaper artist. He was imprisoned for four months in 1941 during Independence movement. He also participated actively in temple entry movement. He served as a director of Sun Paper Mill Ltd in 77-78 He was lawyer by profession and served as an Advocate in Supreme Court of India. He served as the member of Central Legislative assembly between 1945 and 1947. He also served as a member of Tamil Nadu legislative assembly between 1952 and 1957. He was elected to the Tamil Nadu legislative assembly as an Indian National Congress candidate from Tiruchendur constituency in 1952 election. He was one of the two elected members from that constituency, the other being V. Arumugam (Indian politician) from Kisan Mazdoor Praja Party. He also served as a member of Tamil Nadu legislative council between 1958–1964 and 1967–1971.

References 

Dravida Munnetra Kazhagam politicians
1904 births
1981 deaths
Date of death missing
Tamil Nadu politicians